Barry Reed may refer to:

 Barry Reed (author) (1927–2002), American trial lawyer and bestselling author
 Barry Reed (cricketer) (born 1937), former English cricketer

See also
Barry Reid (disambiguation)